AS Sotema is a Malagasy football club based in Mahajanga, Madagascar.

Achievements
THB Champions League: 4
 1985, 1989, 1991, 1992

Coupe de Madagascar: 3
 1978, 1979, 1982

Performance in CAF competitions
 African Cup of Champions Clubs: 4 appearances
1986: First Round
1990: First Round
1992: Second Round
1993: Second Round

CAF Cup Winners' Cup: 3 appearances
1979 – Quarter-Finals
1980 – First Round
1983 – Second Round

References

Football clubs in Madagascar